is a Japanese politician and current governor of Miyagi Prefecture. A native of Toyonaka, Osaka and former serviceman of Japan Self-Defense Forces, he was first elected governor in 2005 after serving in the Miyagi Prefectural Assembly since 1995.

In July 2017 Murai approved the online publication of a tourism promotion video that was created using 2011 Tōhoku earthquake and tsunami reconstruction funds and starred actress and gravure idol Mitsu Dan. Female members of the Miyagi Prefectural Assembly, along with members of the public, claimed that the video was sexually suggestive and demanded that it be taken down. Murai initially defended the video on the grounds that it successfully brought attention to the prefecture, but hundreds of complaints were filed in the month after publication, and he ordered the video withdrawn in August 2017.

References 

1960 births
Living people
People from Toyonaka, Osaka
Governors of Miyagi Prefecture
Members of the Miyagi Prefectural Assembly
National Defense Academy of Japan alumni
Liberal Democratic Party (Japan) politicians